Clavulina is a genus of aggulinated benthic foraminiferans with an elongate test. The early stage is triserial and triangular in section, the later stage uniserial and rectilinear, with angular to rounded section. In some species agglutinated walls have considerable calcareous cement. Septa are secondarily doubled as a result of imperforate floors, which are added as new chambers are formed. Walls contain fine bifurcating canaliculi within, openings of which are sealed internally by an inner organic lining, and externally by the imperforate surface layer of the wall. The aperture is interiomarginal in the early triserial stage, terminal and rounded in the adult.

The genus Clavulina was named by  d'Orbigny, 1826. It is included in the textulariid family, Valvulinidae and is cosmopolitan in distribution, with a range extending from the Paleocene to now.

Species 
There are many species, extant and extinct, including:
 †Clavulina alazanensis Nuttall, 1932
 †Clavulina anglica Cushman, 1936
 Clavulina angularis d'Orbigny, 1826
 Clavulina arenata Cushman, 1933

 Names brought to synonymy
 †Clavulina antipodum Stache, 1864 and †Clavulina elegans Karrer, 1864, synonyms for †Arenodosaria antipodum (Stache, 1864)

References 

 Joseph A. Cushman, 1950. Foraminifera, their classification and economic use. Harvard University Press, Cambridge, Massachusetts. Fourth edition, 1950
 Alfred R. Loeblich Jr and Helen Tappan, 1964. Sarcodina, chiefly "Thecamoebians" and Foraminiferida. Treatise on Invertebrate Paleontology, Part C, Protista 2.  Geological Society of America and University of Kansas Press, 1964.
 Valvulinidae in Loeblich and Tappan, 1988, Foraminiferal genera and their classification.

External links 
 Clavulina at WoRMS

Globothalamea
Foraminifera genera
Fossil taxa described in 1826
Extant Paleocene first appearances